The Road from Elephant Pass may refer to:

 The Road from Elephant Pass (film), the film directed by Chandran Rutnum
 The Road from Elephant Pass (novel), the novel narrated by Nihal De Silva